Miami County is a county located in the U.S. state of Indiana. As of 2020, the population was 35,962.  The county seat is the City of Peru. Miami County is part of the Kokomo-Peru CSA.

History
Indiana became a state on December 11, 1816, after being Indiana territory for sixteen years. Originally, Indiana was part of the Northwest Territory, which was made up of land gained by the British after the French and Indian War and organized into a territory after the American Revolution. It was after the revolution that settlement in the area by Europeans really began. Knox territory was created in 1790 and included all of present-day Indiana and areas of Illinois. Ancestry's Red Book notes that jurisdiction in Knox territory changed due to Indian uprisings in the area from 1790 to 1810. In 1800, Indiana became the name of a territory. Parts Michigan and Illinois both broke away from the territory before it became a state in 1816.

Miami County was formed in 1832 from Cass County and unorganized land. It was named for the Miami, a Native American people, many of whom still live in this area. In 1834, Miami County widened its western border taking some area from Cass County. In 1838 a small portion of unorganized territory was added to the northeastern border, but in 1844 that area was lost to Fulton County. Miami County has been its present shape since 1844.

Geography

Adjacent counties
 Fulton County  (north)
 Wabash County  (east)
 Grant County  (southeast)
 Howard County  (south)
 Cass County (west)

Major highways

  U.S. Route 24
  U.S. Route 31
  State Road 16
  State Road 18
  State Road 19
  State Road 124
  State Road 218

Communities

City
 Peru

Towns
 Amboy
 Bunker Hill
 Converse
 Denver
 Macy

Census-designated places
 Grissom AFB
 Mexico

Other unincorporated places

 Bennetts Switch
 Birmingham
 Chili
 Courter
 Deedsville
 Doyle
 Erie
 Flora
 Gilead
 Loree
 McGrawsville
 Miami
 Nead
 New Santa Fe
 North Grove
 Oakdale
 Oakley
 Park View Heights
 Peoria
 Perrysburg
 Pettysville
 Santa Fe
 South Peru
 Stockdale
 Wawpecong
 Wells

Extinct

 Anson
 Brownell
 Busaco
 Cary
 Five Corners
 Hooversburg
 Leonda
 Niconza
 Paw Paw
 Snow Hill
 Stringtown
 Wagoner
 Wooleytown

Townships

 Allen Township
 Butler Township
 Clay Township
 Deer Creek Township
 Erie Township
 Harrison Township
 Jackson Township
 Jefferson Township
 Perry Township
 Peru Township
 Pipe Creek Township
 Richland Township
 Union Township
 Washington Township

Climate and weather 

Government

The county government is a constitutional body, and is granted specific powers by the Constitution of Indiana, and by the Indiana Code.

County Council: The county council is the legislative branch of the county government and controls all the spending and revenue collection in the county. Representatives are elected from county districts. The council members serve four-year terms. They are responsible for setting salaries, the annual budget, and special spending. The council also has limited authority to impose local taxes, in the form of an income and property tax that is subject to state level approval, excise taxes, and service taxes.

Board of Commissioners: The executive body of the county is made of a board of commissioners. The commissioners are elected county-wide, in staggered terms, and each serves a four-year term. One of the commissioners, typically the most senior, serves as president. The commissioners are charged with executing the acts legislated by the council, collecting revenue, and managing the day-to-day functions of the county government.

Court: The county maintains a small claims court that can handle some civil cases. The judge on the court is elected to a term of four years and must be a member of the Indiana Bar Association. The judge is assisted by a constable who is also elected to a four-year term. In some cases, court decisions can be appealed to the state level circuit court.

County Officials: The county has several other elected offices, including sheriff, coroner, auditor, treasurer, recorder, surveyor, and circuit court clerk Each of these elected officers serves a term of four years and oversees a different part of county government. Members elected to county government positions are required to declare party affiliations and to be residents of the county.

Miami County is part of Indiana's 2nd congressional district; Indiana Senate district 18; and Indiana House of Representatives districts 23, 24 and 32.

Demographics

As of the 2010 United States Census, there were 36,903 people, 13,456 households, and 9,330 families residing in the county. The racial makeup of the county was 91.8% white, 4.5% black or African American, 0.9% American Indian, 0.3% Asian, 0.6% from other races, and 1.8% from two or more races. Those of Hispanic or Latino origin made up 2.5% of the population. In terms of ancestry, 27.2% were German, 17.3% were American, 12.0% were Irish, and 8.4% were English.

Of the 13,456 households, 32.5% had children under the age of 18 living with them, 53.2% were married couples living together, 11.3% had a female householder with no husband present, 30.7% were non-families, and 26.2% of all households were made up of individuals. The average household size was 2.49 and the average family size was 2.97. The median age was 39.5 years.

The median income for a household in the county was $47,697 and the median income for a family was $49,282. Males had a median income of $40,038 versus $26,011 for females. The per capita income for the county was $18,854. About 13.0% of families and 16.7% of the population were below the poverty line, including 26.6% of those under age 18 and 8.9% of those age 65 or over.

Major employers of Miami County include:
Ferrellgas (Peru )
Schneider Electric Square D (Peru )
Miami Correctional Facility (Bunker Hill )
Indiana Correction Dept (Bunker Hill )
Armour-Eckrich Meats (Peru )
American Stationery Co (Peru ) http://www.americanstationery.com
Dukes Memorial Hospital (Peru ) http://www.dukesmemorialhosp.com
Miami County (Peru )
Bryan Steam LLC (Peru ) http://www.bryanboilers.com
Snavely Machine & Mfg Co Inc (Peru )

See also
 National Register of Historic Places listings in Miami County, Indiana

Further reading
 Bodurtha, Arthur Lawrence. History of Miami County, Indiana: A Narrative Account of Its Historical Progress, Its People and Its Principal Interests, Volume 1. 1865. Charleston: Nabu Press (2010). 
 Coppernoll, Marilyn. Miami County, Indiana: A Pictorial History. Peru: Miami County Historical Society (1995). 
 Kingman Brothers. Combination atlas map of Miami County, Indiana. Charleston: Nabu Press (2011).

References

 
Indiana counties
Indiana placenames of Native American origin
1834 establishments in Indiana
Populated places established in 1834